Time Bomb 9/11 or just Time Bomb was a Hindi political thriller that aired on Zee TV from 20 June 2005 to 28 November 2005. It used to air every Monday at 10:00pm, and the show had a similar format to "24". The story focuses on Osama Bin Laden and his terrorist group aiming to destroy the city of New Delhi on 11 September as well as assassinating the Indian Prime Minister who was played by Kay Kay Menon. A RAW group led by Field Officer Varun Awasthi (played by Rajeev Khandelwal) has to protect the Prime Minister and more importantly, the city.

It also starred Pankaj Tripathi as one of the RAW Officers.

Cast 
 Rajeev Khandelwal as Field Officer Varun Awasthi 
Ujjwal Chopra as Amar RAW Agent 
 Amrita Saluja Raichand as Roma Awasthi
 Akashdeep Saigal as Usmaan Bin Laden
Kay Kay Menon as Prime Minister of India Anirudh Prakash
Rajat Kapoor as Industrialist Narendra Nath
Amruta Khanvilkar  as Anu, Prime Minister's Daughter
 Shrivallabh Vyas  as   Osama Bin Laden
 Aamir Bashir as Mr. Sejpal/ R. Diwan, Contract Killer from South Africa
 Shivani Tanksale as Menaka Senior Field Officer
 Denzil Smith as Head of ACT RAW
Pankaj Tripathi as ACT RAW Officer Tripathi
 Vivan Bhatena
 Anupam Shyam as Ramji Yadav, one of the MP (He was later revealed to be involved in the conspiracy against the PM)
Bikramjeet Kanwarpal as Dr. Ghoshal
 Abhijit Lahiri
 Anand Abhyankar
 Igal Fingali as Habib
Achyut Potdar as The President of India

External links 

Zee TV original programming
Indian drama television series
2005 Indian television series debuts
2006 Indian television series endings